Break Time Masti Time premiered on Disney Channel India on 6 October 2008. It is an Indian adaption of the Disney Channel Italy original series Quelli dell'intervallo.

Characters 
 Devansh Doshi as Addy, the cool one  
 Sagar Sawarkar as Rohan, the joker full of ideas
 Benazir Shaikh as Priyanka, best buddy
 Shivshakti Sachdev as Pari, drama queen diva
 Akash Bhatija as Dushyant, the foodie
 Tanvi Hegde as Delnaaz, chatterbox
 Rahul Joshi as Suraj, teachers' pet
 Umang Jain as Mahua, smarty pants
 Parth Muni as Swami, an intelligent geek

Episodes

See also
 As the Bell Rings

External links 
 Official site

Disney Channel (Indian TV channel) original programming
2008 Indian television series debuts
2009 Indian television series endings
Indian television series based on non-Indian television series
Indian teen sitcoms
2000s high school television series
2000s teen sitcoms
Television series about teenagers